Tyrone Rogers (born March 9, 1974 in Montgomery, Alabama) is a former defensive end in the NFL. He played his entire career for the Cleveland Browns from 1999 to 2004. After his Pro football career Rogers went back to Alabama as a defensive coach at Alabama State University, then later at Robert E. Lee High School in Montgomery, Alabama.

References

1974 births
Cleveland Browns players
American football defensive ends
Alabama State Hornets football players
Living people